This is a list of events in Scottish television from 1963.

Events

8 January - The Beatles record a performance for the children's programme Roundup at the Scottish Television studios in Glasgow.
Unknown - Fifty Grampian shows feature in the local Top Ten audience ratings.

Television series
Scotsport (1957–2008)
The White Heather Club (1958–1968)
Dr. Finlay's Casebook (1962–1971)
The Adventures of Francie and Josie (1962–1970)

Births

8 May - Stella Gonet, actress
21 September - Angus Macfadyen, actor
4 November - Lena Zavaroni, singer and television presenter (died 1999)
24 November - Cal MacAninch, actor
28 November - Armando Iannucci, comedian
Unknown - Stephen Jardine, journalist and presenter

Deaths
5 March - Cyril Smith, 70, actor

See also
1963 in Scotland

References

 
Television in Scotland by year
1960s in Scottish television